Conan the Adventurer may refer to:

 Conan the Barbarian, the fictional barbarian from stories by Robert E. Howard
 Conan the Adventurer (short story collection), a 1966 collection of four fantasy short stories by Robert E. Howard and L. Sprague de Camp
 Conan the Adventurer (1992 TV series), a 1990s animated series
 Conan the Adventurer (1997 TV series), a live-action television series starring Ralf Möller
 Conan the Adventurer (comics), a 1994 comic book series

See also
 Conan (disambiguation)
 Conan the Barbarian (disambiguation)
 Conan the Cimmerian (disambiguation)
 Conan of Cimmeria (disambiguation)
 Conan the Conqueror (disambiguation)
 Conan the Destroyer (disambiguation)
 Adventurer (disambiguation)